Mikhail Viktorovich Vanyov (born 27 November 1981) is a former Russian professional footballer.

Club career
He made his debut in the Russian Premier League in 2005 for FC Tom Tomsk.

External links
 

1981 births
Living people
People from Krasnokamensky District
Russian footballers
Association football midfielders
FC Tom Tomsk players
FC Zvezda Irkutsk players
FC Dynamo Barnaul players
Russian Premier League players
FC Chita players
Sportspeople from Zabaykalsky Krai